Kala Siguida is a rural commune in the Cercle of Niono in the Ségou Region of Mali. The commune covers an area of approximately 377 square kilometers and includes 15 villages. In the 2009 census it had a population of 20,335.  The seat of the local administration is the village of Molodo.

References

External links
.

Communes of Ségou Region